Joel William Cooper (born 29 February 1996) is a Northern Irish professional footballer who plays as a winger for NIFL Premiership club Linfield.

Cooper began his career with local NIFL Championship club Ballyclare Comrades, playing 49 games before joining Glenavon in the NIFL Premiership in 2015. He won the Irish Cup and NIFL Charity Shield with Glentoran and was named as Northern Ireland Young Player of the Year for the 2015–16 season. He signed with Linfield in 2018 and won two NIFL Premiership titles and an Irish League Cup title, as well as the Northern Ireland Football Writers' Association Player of the Year award for the 2019–20 season. He moved to the English Football League after signing with Oxford United for an undisclosed fee in July 2020, though spent the second half of the 2020–21 season back on loan at Linfield, where he would win another Premiership and Irish Cup title. He joined Port Vale on loan for the second half of the 2021–22 season. He returned to Northern Ireland and rejoined Linfield in May 2022.

Club career

Ballyclare Comrades
Cooper started his career playing on the left-side of a 4–4–2 at Ballyclare Comrades after being brought to Dixon Park from Ballyclare Colts by Stephen Hughes. He made a total of 20 appearances under Eddie Hill in the 2013–14 season and scored eight goals in 29 games in the 2014–15 campaign as the Comrades posted mid-table finishes in the NIFL Championship. He spent a week on trial at Scottish League One club Stranraer in July 2015.

Glenavon
Cooper was signed to Glenavon as manager Gary Hamilton "felt he had everything to step up a level" into the NIFL Premiership. In his first season at the club, he helped them reach the Irish Cup final at Windsor Park on 7 May 2016; Cooper started the match as Glenavon defeated favourites Linfield 2–0. At the end of the 2015–16 season, Cooper was named the Northern Ireland Young Player of the Year after scoring eight goals and providing 20 assists for the "Lurgan Blues".

Glenavon won the NIFL Charity Shield on 30 July 2016 after beating league champions Crusaders 1–0 at Mourneview Park. Cooper scored seven goals in 41 appearances as Glenavon posted a sixth-place finish at the end of the 2016–17 season. His departure from the club was announced in August 2017 as he accepted a scholarship offer from the University of New Hampshire in the United States. However, he did not end up taking the scholarship and returned to Glenavon, scoring two goals in 17 games during the 2017–18 season.

Linfield
On 24 January 2018, Cooper agreed a pre-contract deal with Linfield, with a three-year contract due to start ahead of the 2018–19 season. He was utilised as part of an interchangeable three behind the striker in a 4–2–3–1 system and scored seven goals in 33 league games as Linfield won the Premiership title at the end of the 2018–19 season. He also featured in the first leg of the Champions Cup, a 1–1 draw with Dundalk at Windsor Park, but missed the second leg with a nose injury; Dundalk won the return fixture 6–0. The "Blues" also finished as runners-up in the County Antrim Shield, losing 4–3 to Crusaders.

In his second season with Linfield, Cooper scored 11 league goals and provided a further 17 assists, as the club were crowned 2019–20 league champions. In addition to 33 domestic appearances, he also featured five times in the UEFA Europa League, where Linfield reached the final round of qualification before losing to Qarabağ on the Away goals rule. He was named as Northern Ireland Football Writers' Association Player of the Year; Cooper said "It's been a crazy few months for me and while 2020 probably hasn't been a great year for a lot of people it's been brilliant for me".

Oxford United
On 23 July 2020, Cooper signed a three-year contract with Oxford United in League One after joining for an undisclosed fee. Cooper became the third player from an Irish league side to join Oxford, following in the footsteps of Gavin Whyte and Mark Sykes. Cooper made his Oxford debut on 12 September, coming on as a second-half substitute in a 2–0 defeat at Lincoln City in the first match of the 2020–21 season. He made his full debut for Oxford at the Kassam Stadium three days later in an EFL Cup match against Watford, providing the assist for Robert Hall's goal, though the "U's" would lose in a penalty shoot-out after the match finished 1–1. Cooper returned home to Northern Ireland in November to deal with ongoing personal issues and manager Karl Robinson looked to secure him a loan move in order to maintain his fitness as the issues at home required Cooper's continued presence.

Speaking in August 2021, Robinson confirmed that the personal issues had been resolved and that Cooper was ready to play for Oxford again. However, he played just two League One and three EFL Trophy games, scoring twice against Tottenham Hotspur U21s. On 9 May 2022, the club announced that Cooper would leave at the end of the 2021–22 season and "will now return to Northern Ireland as a free agent having reached agreement with the U’s to terminate his contract".

Loan to Linfield
In December 2020, it was announced that Cooper would return to Linfield on loan for the remainder of the 2020–21 season once the January transfer window opened. However, despite having three weeks' notice, the Irish Football Association failed to complete his registration in time to play on 23 January, much to manager David Healy's frustration. On 21 May 2021, Cooper scored the winning goal for Linfield as the club defeated Larne in the Irish Cup final to claim a league and cup double.

Loan to Port Vale
On 27 January 2022, Cooper joined League Two side Port Vale on loan until the end of the 2021–22 season. He made his debut at Vale Park as a late substitute on 29 January and would make a further five appearances – all away from home – between then and 5 March.

Return to Linfield
On 24 May 2022, Cooper returned to NIFL Premiership side Linfield on a three-year contract.

International career
Cooper was called up to the Northern Ireland under-21 squad by manager Jim Magilton in August 2015, at which point he had acquired the nickname of the ‘Mourneview Messi’. He won a total of five youth-team caps. In August 2020, Cooper was called up by manager Ian Baraclough to join the Northern Ireland senior squad for UEFA Nations League matches against Romania and Norway in September.

Style of play
Cooper is a versatile winger who is able to play on either flank.

Career statistics

Honours
Glenavon
Irish Cup: 2015–16
NIFL Charity Shield: 2016

Linfield
NIFL Premiership: 2018–19, 2019–20, 2020–21
Irish Cup: 2020–21
County Antrim Shield runner-up: 2018–19
Champions Cup runner-up: 2019

Individual
Northern Ireland Young Player of the Year: 2015–16
Northern Ireland Football Writers' Association Player of the Year: 2019–20

References

1996 births
Living people
Association footballers from Northern Ireland
Northern Ireland youth international footballers
Northern Ireland under-21 international footballers
Association football wingers
Ballyclare Comrades F.C. players
Glenavon F.C. players
Linfield F.C. players
Oxford United F.C. players
Port Vale F.C. players
NIFL Championship players
NIFL Premiership players
English Football League players